Fauna Europaea is a database of the scientific names and distribution of all living multicellular European land and fresh-water animals. It serves as a standard taxonomic source for animal taxonomy within the Pan-European Species directories Infrastructure (PESI). , Fauna Europaea reported that their database contained 235,708 taxon names and 173,654 species names.

Its construction was initially funded by the European Council (2000–2004). The project was co-ordinated by the University of Amsterdam which launched the first version in 2004, after which the database was transferred to the Natural History Museum Berlin in 2015.

References

External links

Fauna Europaea
Fauna Europaea – all European animal species on the web (article)
Contributions on Fauna Europaea (data papers)
PESI - a taxonomic backbone for Europe

Biodiversity databases
Databases in Europe
Fauna of Europe